Allan Robert Taylor  (23 August 1941 – 19 June 2007) was an Australian diplomat, best known for his service as Director-General of the Australian Secret Intelligence Service from 1998 to 2003.

Early life and education
Taylor was born in Wynyard, Tasmania, and spent his childhood in various Tasmanian towns before boarding at Launceston Church Grammar School. He graduated with a Bachelor of Arts in Modern History from the University of Tasmania. He then studied as Tasmania's 1963 Rhodes scholar at the University of Oxford, where he received a Master of Arts in History in 1965. His studies led to an interest in diplomacy, and in 1966 he joined the Department of External Affairs, Australia's foreign service.

Diplomatic career
Taylor's early postings were to Pakistan and Thailand. After a posting in Canberra, he was sent to Jakarta to serve as political counsellor for the Australian Embassy. His first posting as head of a consular station was as High Commissioner to Nigeria from 1983 to 1985. From 1989 to 1993, he was High Commissioner to Papua New Guinea. In 1994 he returned to Jakarta as Australian Ambassador to Indonesia. Taylor was appointed a Member of the Order of Australia in 1995 for his "service to international relations".

Australian Secret Intelligence Service
Taylor was Director-General of the Australian Secret Intelligence Service from 1998 to 2003.

References

1941 births
2007 deaths
Directors-General of the Australian Secret Intelligence Service
Members of the Order of Australia
Recipients of the Centenary Medal
University of Tasmania alumni
Australian Rhodes Scholars
People from Wynyard, Tasmania
Ambassadors of Australia to Indonesia
High Commissioners of Australia to Papua New Guinea
High Commissioners of Australia to Nigeria
High Commissioners of Australia to Ghana
High Commissioners of Australia to the Gambia
High Commissioners of Australia to Sierra Leone